The Fort of Our Lady of the Conception, also known as the Portuguese Castle, is a red stone fortress on Hormuz Island, Iran. It is one of the last surviving monuments of Portuguese colonial rule in the Persian Gulf.
Ormuz (or Hormuz) was an important maritime city and a small kingdom near the entrance to the Persian Gulf. The original site of the city was on the north shore of the Gulf, about 30 miles east of the current Bandar Abbas. Around 1300, apparently in response to attacks from the Tartars, it moved to the small island of Gerun, which can be identified as the Organa of Nearcho, about 12 miles west and 5 miles from the coast.

Constructed on reddish stone on a rocky promontory at the far north of the island, the castle was originally cut off from the rest of the island by a moat, traces of which still remain. Although most of the roof caved in long ago, much of the lower part of the very substantial outer walls is intact, with the remains lying on different levels of the site.

History

The building of the castle was ordered by Portuguese commander Afonso de Albuquerque in 1507, when his forces seized the island for a short time, being then named "Fort of Our Lady of Victory" (Forte de Nossa Senhora da Vitória). Engaging his men of all ranks in the building works, Albuquerque faced a revolt and had to retreat. He came back and reconquered the island in 1515, when he completed and renamed the fort. The Persian Safavid king, Abbas I of Persia (1587–1629), wanted to end Portuguese rule in the south and eventually managed to convince the British East India Company to allow its ships to cooperate with his land forces to seize the island from the Portuguese in 1622.

Other Portuguese castles
A number of other Portuguese castles are found in the Persian Gulf islands, including the castle in Qeshm.

During the Habsburg Dynasty (1581–1640), the Portuguese built a fortress in Dibba Al-Hisn and a wall around the city. In August 1648, the Arabs besieged Muscat, Oman, and on 31 October 1648 a treaty was signed between the two opponents. The terms were as follows: the Portuguese should build the fortress of Kuriyat, Dibba Al-Hisn and Matrah (Oman).

See also
List of Iranian castles
Iranian architecture

References

16th-century fortifications
Castles in Iran
Architecture in Iran
Portuguese forts
Hormuz Island
Portuguese Empire
Buildings and structures in Hormozgan Province
National works of Iran
Portuguese colonial architecture in Iran
Our Lady